Robert Norton Noyce (December 12, 1927 – June 3, 1990), nicknamed "the Mayor of Silicon Valley", was an American physicist and entrepreneur who co-founded Fairchild Semiconductor in 1957 and Intel Corporation in 1968. He was  also credited with the realization of the first monolithic integrated circuit or microchip, which fueled the personal computer revolution and gave Silicon Valley its name.

Early life
Noyce was born on December 12, 1927, in Burlington, Iowa the third of four sons of the Rev. Ralph Brewster Noyce. His father graduated from Doane College, Oberlin College, and the Chicago Theological Seminary and was also nominated for a Rhodes Scholarship.

His mother, Harriet May Norton, was the daughter of the Rev. Milton J. Norton, a Congregational clergyman, and Louise Hill. She was a graduate of Oberlin College and prior to her marriage, she had dreams of becoming a missionary. Journalist Tom Wolfe described her as "an intelligent woman with a commanding will".

Noyce had three siblings: Donald Sterling Noyce, Gaylord Brewster Noyce and Ralph Harold Noyce. His brother Donald would go on to become a respected professor and associate dean of undergraduate affairs in the UC Berkeley College of Chemistry; Robert later created the Donald Sterling Noyce Prize to reward excellence in undergraduate teaching at Berkeley. His brother Gaylord would go on to become a respected professor of practical theology and dean of students at Yale Divinity School; in 1961, while a young professor, he was arrested for being one of the Freedom Riders of the civil rights movement.

Noyce's earliest childhood memory involved beating his father at ping pong and feeling shocked when his mother reacted to the news of his victory with a distracted "Wasn't that nice of Daddy to let you win?" Even at the age of five, Noyce felt offended by the notion of intentionally losing. "That's not the game", he sulked to his mother. "If you're going to play, play to win!"

When Noyce was twelve years old in the summer of 1940, he and his brother built a boy-sized aircraft, which they used to fly from the roof of the Grinnell College stables. Later he built a radio from scratch and motorized his sled by welding a propeller and a motor from an old washing machine to the back of it. His parents were both religious but Noyce became an agnostic and irreligious in later life.

Education
Noyce grew up in Grinnell, Iowa. While in high school, he exhibited a talent for mathematics and science and took the Grinnell College freshman physics course in his senior year. He graduated from Grinnell High School in 1945 and entered Grinnell College in the fall of that year. He was the star diver on the 1947 Midwest Conference Championship swim team. While at Grinnell College, Noyce sang, played the oboe and acted. In Noyce's junior year, he got in trouble for stealing a 25-pound pig from the Grinnell mayor's farm and roasting it at a school luau. The mayor wrote to his parents stating that “In the agricultural state of Iowa, stealing a domestic animal is a felony which carries a minimum penalty of a year in prison and a fine of  one dollar.” Noyce faced expulsion from school but  Grant Gale, Noyce's physics professor and president of the college, did not want to lose a student with Noyce's potential. They compromised with the mayor so that Grinnell would compensate him for the pig, and suspend Noyce for one semester.  He returned in February 1949. He graduated Phi Beta Kappa with a BA in physics and mathematics in 1949. He also received a single honor from his classmates: the Brown Derby Prize, which recognized "the senior man who earned the best grades with the least amount of work".

While Noyce was an undergraduate, he was fascinated by the field of physics and took a course in the subject that was taught by professor Grant Gale. Gale obtained two of the very first transistors ever produced by Bell Labs and showed them off to his class. Noyce was hooked. Gale suggested that he apply to the doctoral program in physics at MIT, which he did.

Noyce had a mind so quick that his graduate school friends called him "Rapid Robert". He received his doctorate in physics from MIT in 1953.

Career

After graduating from MIT in 1953, Noyce took a job as a research engineer at the Philco Corporation in Philadelphia. He left in 1956 to join William Shockley, a co-inventor of the transistor and eventual Nobel Prize winner, at the Shockley Semiconductor Laboratory in Mountain View, California.

Noyce left a year later with the "traitorous eight" upon having issues with Shockley's management style, and co-founded the influential Fairchild Semiconductor corporation. According to Sherman Fairchild, Noyce's impassioned presentation of his vision was the reason Fairchild had agreed to create the semiconductor division for the traitorous eight.

After Jack Kilby invented the first hybrid integrated circuit (hybrid IC) in 1958, Noyce in 1959 independently invented a new type of integrated circuit, the monolithic integrated circuit (monolithic IC). It was more practical than Kilby's implementation. Noyce's design was made of silicon, whereas Kilby's chip was made of germanium. Noyce's invention was the first monolithic integrated circuit chip. Unlike Kilby's IC which had external wire connections and could not be mass-produced, Noyce's monolithic IC chip put all components on a chip of silicon and connected them with copper lines. The basis for Noyce's monolithic IC was the planar process, developed in early 1959 by Jean Hoerni.

Noyce and Gordon Moore founded Intel in 1968 when they left Fairchild Semiconductor. Arthur Rock, the chairman of Intel's board and a major investor in the company, said that for Intel to succeed, the company needed Noyce, Moore and Andrew Grove. And it needed them in that order. Noyce: the visionary, born to inspire; Moore: the virtuoso of technology; and Grove: the technologist turned management scientist. The relaxed culture that Noyce brought to Intel was a carry-over from his style at Fairchild Semiconductor. He treated employees as family, rewarding and encouraging teamwork. Noyce's management style could be called "roll up your sleeves". He shunned fancy corporate cars, reserved parking spaces, private jets, offices, and furnishings in favor of a less-structured, relaxed working environment in which everyone contributed and no one received lavish benefits. By declining the usual executive perks he stood as a model for future generations of Intel CEOs.

At Intel, he oversaw invention of the microprocessor as a concept by Ted Hoff and design of the first commercial microprocessor Intel 4004 by Federico Faggin, which was his second revolution.

Personal life
In 1953, Noyce married Elizabeth Bottomley, who was a 1951 graduate of Tufts University. While living in Los Altos, California they had four children: William B., Pendred, Priscilla, and Margaret.  Elizabeth loved New England, so the family acquired a 50-acre coastal summer home in Bremen, Maine. Elizabeth and the children would summer there. Robert would visit during the summer, but he continued working at Intel during the summer.  They divorced in 1974.

On November 27, 1974, Noyce married Ann Schmeltz Bowers. Bowers, a graduate of Cornell University, also received an honorary Ph.D. from Santa Clara University, where she was a trustee for nearly 20 years. She was the first Director of Personnel for Intel Corporation and the first Vice President of Human Resources for Apple Inc. She currently serves as chair of the Board and the founding trustee of the Noyce Foundation.

Noyce kept active his entire life. He enjoyed reading Hemingway, and he flew his own airplane and also participated in hang-gliding and scuba diving.  Noyce believed that microelectronics would continue to advance in complexity and sophistication well beyond its current state; this led to the question of what use society would make of the technology.  In his last interview, Noyce was asked what he would do if he were "emperor" of the United States.  He said that he would, among other things, "…make sure we are preparing our next generation to flourish in a high-tech age. And that means education of the lowest and the poorest, as well as at the graduate school level."

Death
Noyce suffered a heart attack at age 62 at home on June 3, 1990, and later died at the Seton Medical Center in Austin, Texas.

Awards and honors
In July 1959, he filed for  "Semiconductor Device and Lead Structure", a type of integrated circuit. This independent effort was recorded only a few months after the key findings of inventor Jack Kilby. For his co-invention of the integrated circuit and its world-transforming impact, three presidents of the United States honored him.

Noyce was a holder of many honors and awards. President Ronald Reagan awarded him the National Medal of Technology in 1987. Two years later, he was inducted into the U.S. Business Hall of Fame sponsored by Junior Achievement, during a black tie ceremony keynoted by President George H. W. Bush. In 1990 Noycealong with, among others, Jack Kilby and transistor inventor John Bardeenreceived a "Lifetime Achievement Medal" during the bicentennial celebration of the Patent Act.

Noyce received the Franklin Institute's Stuart Ballantine Medal in 1966. He was awarded the IEEE Medal of Honor in 1978 "for his contributions to the silicon integrated circuit, a cornerstone of modern electronics." In 1979, he was awarded the National Medal of Science. He also received Faraday Medal in 1979. Noyce was elected a Fellow of the American Academy of Arts and Sciences in 1980. The National Academy of Engineering awarded him its 1989 Charles Stark Draper Prize.

The science building at his alma mater, Grinnell College, is named after him.

On December 12, 2011, Noyce was honored with a Google Doodle celebrating the 84th anniversary of his birth.

In 2000, Kilby received the Nobel Prize in Physics; in his acceptance ("Nobel Lecture"), he mentions a small number of people whose work contributed to the success of integrated circuits, mentioning Noyce three times.

Legacy
The Noyce Foundation was founded in 1990 by his family. The foundation was dedicated to improving public education in mathematics and science in grades K-12. The foundation announced that it would end operations in 2015.

In 1990, Congress established the Robert Noyce National Math and Science Teachers Corps Act which authorizes awards up to 5,000 scholarships annually to assist individuals in obtaining a teaching degree.   These awards are granted to institutions of higher education who administer the projects after successful proposal submissions through the National Science Foundation's Robert Noyce Teacher Scholarship Program ("Noyce").   Pre-service teachers are recruited by their college/university and must be STEM majors.  Scholarship recipients to agree to teach science or mathematics in a high-need school districts for at least two years for each fiscal year the recipient received such a scholarship.  The American Association for the Advancement of Science (AAAS) works with the NSF Robert Noyce Teacher Scholarship Program to identify and disseminate information about effective practices and strategies for attracting, selecting, and preparing new K-12 STEM teachers and retaining them in the STEM teacher workforce.

Patents
Noyce was granted 15 patents. Patents are listed in order issued, not filed.
 Method and apparatus for forming semiconductor structures, filed August 1954, issued February 1959, assigned to Philco Corporation
 Transistor structure and method, filed April 1957, issued March 1960, assigned to Beckmann Instruments
 Semiconductor scanning device, filed June 1959, issued November 1960, assigned to Fairchild Semiconductor
 Transistor structure and method of making the same, filed March 1957, issued January 1961, assigned to Clevite Corporation
 Semiconductor switching device, filed June 1959, issued February 1961, assigned to Fairchild Semiconductor
 Semiconductor Device and Lead Structure, filed July 1959, issued April 1961, assigned to Fairchild Semiconductor
 Field effect transistor, filed January 1958, issued November 1961, assigned to Clevite Corporation
 Field controlled avalanche semiconductive device, filed February 1958, issued July 1963, assigned to Clevite Corporation
 Method for fabricating transistors, filed June 1959, issued October 1963, assigned to Fairchild Camera and Instrument Corp.
 Transistor structure controlled by an avalanche barrier, filed June 1958, issued November 1963, assigned to Clevite Corporation
 Method of making a transistor structure (coinventor William Shockley), filed April 1957, issued July 1964, assigned to Clevite Corporation
 Semiconductor circuit complex having isolation means, filed September 1959, issued September 1964, assigned to Fairchild Camera and Instrument Corp.
 Method of forming a semiconductor, filed July 1963, issued May 1965, assigned to Fairchild Camera and Instrument Corp.
 Solid state circuit with crossing leads, filed April 1961, issued August 1965, assigned to Fairchild Camera and Instrument Corp.
 Trainable system, filed October 1964, issued June 1967, assigned to Fairchild Camera and Instrument Corp.

Note: In 1960 Clevite Corporation acquired Shockley Semiconductor Laboratory, a subsidiary of Beckman Instruments, for whom Noyce worked.

Notes

Citations

References

Berlin, Leslie The man behind the microchip: Robert Noyce and the invention of Silicon Valley  Publisher Oxford University Press US, 2005 
Burt, Daniel S. The chronology of American literature: America's literary achievements from the colonial era to modern times Houghton Mifflin Harcourt, 2004. 
Jones, Emma C. Brewster. The Brewster Genealogy, 1566-1907: a Record of the Descendants of William Brewster of the "Mayflower," ruling elder of the Pilgrim church which founded Plymouth Colony in 1620. New York: Grafton Press, 1908.
Lécuyer, Christophe. Making Silicon Valley: Innovation and the Growth of High Tech, 1930-1970 Published by MIT Press, 2006.
Shurkin, Joel N.. Broken Genius: The Rise and Fall of William Shockley, Creator of the Electronic Age Publisher Palgrave Macmillan, 2007 
Tedlow, Richard S. Giants of enterprise: seven business innovators and the empires they built Publisher Harper Collins, 2003

Further reading

Gaylord, Mary M. Welles. Life and Labors of Rev. Reuben Gaylord Omaha: Rees Printing Company, 1889.
Jones, Emma C. Brewster. The Brewster Genealogy, 1566-1907: a Record of the Descendants of William Brewster of the "Mayflower," ruling elder of the Pilgrim church which founded Plymouth Colony in 1620. New York: Grafton Press, 1908.
Wolfe, Tom. Hooking Up New York. Publisher: Macmillan, 2001.
Wolfe, Tom. The Tinkerings of Robert Noyce, How the Sun Rose on the Silicon Valley, Esquire Magazine, December 1983, pp. 346–374.

External links

Noyce biography on PBS.org
Noyce biography on IdeaFinder.com 
Noyce Foundation website
Guide to the Robert Noyce Papers at Stanford University
Robert Noyce Teacher Scholarship Program

1927 births
1990 deaths
American agnostics
American technology chief executives
American computer businesspeople
20th-century American inventors
20th-century American physicists
Businesspeople from California
Fellows of the American Academy of Arts and Sciences
Grinnell College alumni
IEEE Medal of Honor recipients
Intel people
MIT Department of Physics alumni
National Medal of Science laureates
National Medal of Technology recipients
People from Austin, Texas
People from Burlington, Iowa
People from Santa Clara, California
Draper Prize winners
American chief executives of manufacturing companies
20th-century American businesspeople
Members of the United States National Academy of Sciences
Scientists at Shockley Semiconductor Laboratory